Hu Ling-fang (born 6 April 1998) is a Taiwanese badminton player. In 2016, she was selected to compete at the 2016 Uber Cup in Kunshan, China. She played as a third women's singles and finally the Taiwanese team beat the Mauritanian with the score 5-0. She won her first senior international title at the 2017 Finnish Open in the mixed doubles event partnered with Tseng Min-hao. Hu also joined the national team participating at the 2018 Asian Games.

Achievements

BWF World Tour (1 runner-up) 
The BWF World Tour, which was announced on 19 March 2017 and implemented in 2018, is a series of elite badminton tournaments sanctioned by the Badminton World Federation (BWF). The BWF World Tour is divided into levels of World Tour Finals, Super 1000, Super 750, Super 500, Super 300 (part of the HSBC World Tour), and the BWF Tour Super 100.

Women's doubles

BWF International Challenge/Series (1 title, 1 runner-up) 
Mixed doubles

  BWF International Challenge tournament
  BWF International Series tournament
  BWF Future Series tournament

References

External links 
 

Living people
1998 births
Sportspeople from Kaohsiung
Taiwanese female badminton players
Badminton players at the 2018 Asian Games
Asian Games competitors for Chinese Taipei
21st-century Taiwanese women